Vertigo dedecora is a species of very small air-breathing land snail, a terrestrial pulmonate gastropod mollusk or micromollusk in the family Vertiginidae. 

This species is vulnerable.

Was erroneously placed in genus Ptychalaea.

Description
The length of the shell attains 1.6 mm, its diameter 1 mm.

(Original description) The shell is exceedingly small, obesely oval, dark red-brown and faintly striate. It contains 4¾ convex whorls. The aperture is squarish and well rounded below. The brown outer lip is expanded. The parietal lamella is long and strong;. The angular lamella is well developed and not united with the parietal. The small columellar lamella is deeply placed. The basal is fold small, close to the columella. The lower palatal fold is very small and deeply situated. The upper palatal is large and prominent All the teeth are whitish.

Distribution 
This species is endemic to Japan.

References

External links
 Pilsbry, H. A. & Hirase, Y. (1904). Descriptions of new Japanese land shells. The Nautilus. 17(10): 116–119

Molluscs of Japan
dedecora
Taxonomy articles created by Polbot